Daria Sofia Elisabeth (Lisa) Aschan (born 28 February 1978) is a Swedish film director and screenwriter.

Early life 
Aschan grew up on a farm in Vejbystrand. At the age of twelve, she moved to Gothenburg and then studied at a boarding school in England. After that she studied at Stockholms Filmskola between 1989 and 1999, and at the National Film School of Denmark from 2001 to 2005 to become a director. During her studies, she became known for the commercials Fuck the Rapist!, a number of commercial films about a rape-protection consisting of an awl-clad tampon. Her short films In Transit and Goodbye Bluebird, which were made during the same time, have been shown at different film festivals.

Career 
In 2009, she was a director's assistant at Dramaten and directed the Danish TV series Thea & leoparden for DR's child TV section; the series has also been broadcast in Sweden and several other countries. The three-part series is about a girl who pretends to be a leopard. Aschan has stated that she likes to use animal parables in her productions to make it more clear about human behavioural patterns.

In 2011, she released her first feature film, Apflickorna, which premiered at the Gothenburg Film Festival and won the Dragon Award Best Nordic Film and FIPRESCI awards. Apflickorna has also won the award for Best Narrative Feature at the 2011 Tribeca Film Festival, Best Cinematography at the Transilvania International Film Festival, as well as a Special Mention at the Berlin Film Festival. At the 2012 Guldbagge Awards, Aschan and Josefine Adolfsson won the award for Best Script for the film, and the film also won the Best Film and Best Sound categories.

In 2011, Aschan was awarded the Stockholm Film Festival's newly created long-film scholarship of 5million Swedish kronor (about €550,000, £480,000, or $770,000 in 2011) for her new project, Det vita folket, a science fiction-inspired story about the camps where the government places foreigners that are awaiting deportation. Aschan declined the money as she did not feel that her project fell under the rules of the award. Aschan has described Det vita folket as a space epos with inspiration from the horror film The Shining. The film had its premiere in 2015.

At the 2016 Guldbaggen Awards, Aschan was filmed in the audience giving the finger and saying "Fuck You" to Swedish cinematographer Gösta Reiland. This was after Reiland had won the award for Best Cinematography, and was on his way up to the stage to receive the award. Linda Wassberg, who had filmed Det vita folket, was also nominated in the same category, and Aschan called it a "spontaneous reaction" to Wassberg losing to Reiland.

Filmography 

 2003 – Borta i tankar (based on a novel by )
 2004 – Fuck the Rapist!
 2006 – 
 2007 – 
 2009 – Thea & leoparden
 2011 – Apflickorna
 2015 – 
 2018 – Guds tystnad (short film)
 2019 –

References

External links 

 

1978 births
Living people
People from Skåne County
Swedish people of Russian descent
Swedish screenwriters
Swedish television directors
Swedish women film directors
Swedish women screenwriters
Women television directors